Leonardo Gonçalves Silva or simply Leonardo (born October 26, 1982 in Nova Lima), is a striker. He currently plays for Sport, on loan from Atlético Mineiro.

Honours
Bahia State League: 2004, 2005
Paraná State League: 2006
Rio State Championship: 2007
Taça Guanabara: 2007
Rio State Championship: 2007

Contract
Paraná 2 January 2007 to 2 January 2010

References

External links
 sambafoot
 CBF
 zerozero.pt
 placar
 Guardian Stats Centre

1982 births
Living people
Brazilian footballers
Brazilian expatriate footballers
Villa Nova Atlético Clube players
Criciúma Esporte Clube players
Esporte Clube Vitória players
Paraná Clube players
CR Flamengo footballers
Avaí FC players
Coritiba Foot Ball Club players
Guangzhou City F.C. players
Clube Atlético Mineiro players
CR Vasco da Gama players
Associação Atlética Ponte Preta players
Sport Club do Recife players
Expatriate footballers in China
Campeonato Brasileiro Série A players
Chinese Super League players
Brazilian expatriate sportspeople in China

Association football forwards